is a Japanese basketball player. She represented Japan in the basketball competition at the 2016 Summer Olympics, and at the 2020 Summer Olympics, winning a silver medal.

Career 
She competed at the 2020 FIBA Women’s Asian Cup , 2018 FIBA Women’s World Cup , and 2017 FIBA Women’s Asian Cup.

References

External links

Japanese women's basketball players
Basketball players at the 2016 Summer Olympics
Basketball players at the 2020 Summer Olympics
Olympic basketball players of Japan
1993 births
Living people
Basketball players at the 2010 Summer Youth Olympics
Small forwards
Sportspeople from Hokkaido
Olympic medalists in basketball
Olympic silver medalists for Japan
Medalists at the 2020 Summer Olympics
21st-century Japanese women